This is a list of Arkansas state high school basketball championships sanctioned by the Arkansas Activities Association.

Listings include champions at each classification level based on size. Each classification is based on how large the school is, 6A schools being the biggest, and 1A schools being the smallest.  Early years of high school basketball were limited to a single state championship.

List of Arkansas state high school boys basketball champions 

 2023 - Jonesboro (16), Pine Bluff (14), Little Rock Christian (2), Manila (2)
 2022 - North Little Rock (16), Jonesboro (15), Magnolia (9), Osceola (2), Lavaca, Bradley (2)
 2021 - North Little Rock (15), Jonesboro (14), Little Rock Mills University Studies (5), Harding Academy (2), Lee, Viola 
 2020 - LR Central (19) and Conway (5) co-champs, West Memphis (7) and Jacksonville (3) co-champs, Little Rock Mills University Studies (4) and Magnolia (8) co-champs, Rivercrest and Osceola co-champs, England (3), Nevada (1) (7A, 6A, 5A, and 4A games cancelled due to COVID-19 pandemic; both finalists in each classification were awarded state titles) 
 2019 – FS Northside (11), Marion, Magnolia (7), Ashdown, England (2), Izard County (2)
 2018 – North Little Rock (14), Jonesboro (13), LR Parkview (14), Baptist Prep (6), McGehee, Earle (10), Guy-Perkins (6)
 2017 – FS Northside (10), Jonesboro (12), Little Rock Mills University Studies (2), Baptist Prep (5), Episcopal Collegiate (3), Earle (9), Guy-Perkins (5)
 2016 – Cabot, LR Parkview (13), Forrest City (2), Arkansas Baptist (4), Cedar Ridge (3), Earle (8), Bay (4)
 2015 – North Little Rock (13), Pine Bluff (13), LR McClellan (3), Monticello (2), Episcopal Collegiate (2), England, Bay (3)
 2014 – North Little Rock (12)*, Jonesboro (11), Forrest City, Brookland, Episcopal Collegiate, Cedar Ridge (2), Concord 
 2013 – North Little Rock (11), LR Hall (10), Jacksonville (2), Pottsville, Harding Academy, Cedar Ridge, Bay (2)
 2012 – LR Hall (9), LR Parkview (12), Sylvan Hills, Clarksville(4), Earle (7), East Poinsett County (3), Mammoth Spring
 2011 – LR Hall (8), LR Parkview (11), Alma (2), Clarksville (3), Rivercrest, East Poinsett County (2), Bay
 2010 – Conway (4), LR Hall (7), LR McClellan (2), Jonesboro Westside, Earle (6), Hughes, Wonderview
 2009 – Fayetteville(5), Jacksonville, Greene County Tech (2), Stuttgart, Arkansas Baptist (3), Conway St. Joseph, Guy–Perkins (4)
 2008 – LR Catholic, LR Hall (6), Siloam Springs, Lonoke (2), Rose Bud, Earle (5), Izard County
 2007 – FS Northside (9), Jonesboro (10), Greene County Tech, Huntsville, Riverview, Junction City, Fayetteville Christian
 2006 – LR Parkview (10), Blytheville (3), Dollarway, Buffalo Island Central (4), Guy–Perkins (3)
 2005 – West Memphis (6), Alma, LR Christian, Buffalo Island Central (3), Guy–Perkins (2)
 2004 – West Memphis (5), Mills University Studies, East Poinsett County, Altheimer (2), Waldo (4)
 2003 – Pine Bluff (12), LR Fair (3), Pulaski Academy (2), Altheimer, Weiner
 2002 – LR Parkview (9), Osceola, Pulaski Academy, Poyen, Viola
 2001 – LR Hall (5), Osceola, Hughes, Marked Tree, Emerson
 2000 – LR Fair (2), HS Lakeside, Lonoke (4), Earle (4), Turrell (2)
 1999 – LR Central (18), Watson Chapel, Lonoke (3), Arkansas Baptist (2), Turrell
 1998 – LR Parkview (8), Hot Springs (3), Clarksville (2), Stephens, Walker
 1997 – West Memphis (4), Magnolia, Clarksville, Arkansas Baptist, Guy–Perkins
 1996 – LR Fair, Hot Springs (2), Hamburg, Valley Springs (6), Saratoga (2)
 1995 – LR Parkview (7), Searcy, Atkins, Crawfordsville, Saratoga
 1994 – Jonesboro (9), Dumas (4), Dermott (4), Bradley, Delight
 1993 – LR Parkview (6), Dumas (3), Hamburg, Buffalo Island Central (2), Wabbaseka (5)
 1992 – LR Parkview (5), Stuttgart, Eudora, Buffalo Island Central, Kingsland
 1991 – West Memphis (3), Morrilton (2), Dermott (3), Delta, Wabbaseka (4)
 1990 – Pine Bluff (11), Malvern (2), Star City, Caddo Hills, Parkdale
 1989 – Blytheville (2), Malvern, Dermott (2), Delta (2), Wabbaseka (3)
 1988 – LR Parkview (4), Trumann, Gosnell, Marked Tree, McNeil (3)
 1987 – Fayetteville (4), Dumas (2), Pulaski Robinson, Delta, Parkdale
 1986 – Blytheville, Hope, Dermott, Wabbaseka (2), St. Joseph
 1985 – Russellville, Magnolia (6), Stamps, Earle (3), Carthage
 1984 – LR Hall (4), Harrison, Drew Central (2), Wabbaseka, Parkdale
 1983 – LR Hall (3), Marianna, Camden Fairview, Drew Central, West Side GF, Violet Hill
 1982 – LR Hall (2), El Dorado, Lonoke (2), Gurdon, Valley Springs (5), Blevins
 1981 – LR Hall, West Memphis (2), Bryant, Marvell, Crawfordsville, Wilmar
 1980 – LR Central (17), West Memphis, Magnolia (5), Earle (2), Grady, Parkdale (2)
 1979 – Pine Bluff (10), Blytheville, Osceola, Lake Village, Marmaduke (2), Parkdale
 1978 – LR Parkview (3), Fayetteville (3), Dumas, Star City, Marmaduke, Plumerville
 1977 – Pine Bluff (9), Texarkana, Osceola, Stephens, McNeil (2)
 1976 – El Dorado, Conway (3), Monticello, Holly Grove, McNeil
 1975 – LR Central (16), Fayetteville (2), Magnolia (4), Drew Central, Nemo Vista
 1974 – FS Northside (8), Conway (2), Magnolia (3), Earle, Village
 1973 – LR Central (15), Conway, Morrilton, Stamps, Vaster
 1972 – LR Central (14), LR Parkview (2), Magnolia (2), Stephens (2), Menifee
 1971 – NLR Ole Main (10), LR Parkview, Magnolia, Stephens, County Line
 1970 – LR Central (13), LR McClellan, Searcy, Ouachita, Stephens Carver
 1969 – North Little Rock (9), Camden Lincoln, Lonoke, Desha Central
 1968 – FS Northside (7), Crossett, Green Forest (2), Pyatt
 1967 – North Little Rock (8), Harrison, Green Forest, Taylor
 1966 – LR Central (12), White Hall, Mountain Home, Greenbrier (2)
 1965 – FS Northside (6), Newport, Greenbrier, Bay 
 1964 – North Little Rock (7), Brinkley, Delight 
 1963 – Monticello, Paragould, Lake Hamilton 
 1962 – Jonesboro (8), Manila, Sparkman
 1961 – Helena–West Helena, Nettleton, Valley Springs (4)
 1960 – Leachville, Mulberry, Jasper
 1959 – Fort Smith (5), Ouachita, Pyatt, NLR Jones (4)
 1958 – Fort Smith (4), Sheridan, Marmaduke, NLR Jones (3)
 1957 – Rogers, Viola, NLR Jones (2)
 1956 – Jonesboro (7), Valley View, NLR Jones
 1955 – Fort Smith (3), Delight
 1954 – Jonesboro (6), Oden
 1953 – Clinton, Bergman
 1952 – Pine Bluff (8), Valley Springs (3)
 1951 – Fort Smith (2), Valley Springs (2)
 1950 – Van Buren, Valley Springs
 1949 – North Little Rock (2), Arkansas School/Deaf
 1948 – Fayetteville, Oden
 1947 – Little Rock (11), Ouachita
 1946 – Little Rock (10), Marshall
 1945 – Little Rock (9), HS Lakeside
 1944 – Little Rock (8), Center Ridge
 1943 – North Little Rock, Formosa
 1942 – Jonesboro (5), Marshall
 1941 – Beebe, Judsonia
 1940 – Jonesboro (4), New Edinburg
 1939 – Ash Flat, Violet Hill
 1938 – Jonesboro (3)
 1937 – Jonesboro (2)
 1936 – Coal Hill
 1935 – Pine Bluff (7)
 1934 – Pine Bluff (6)
 1933 – Pine Bluff (5)
 1932 – Hot Springs 
 1931 – Warren
 1930 – Western Grove 
 1929 – Little Rock (7)
 1928 – Pine Bluff (4)
 1927 – Batesville 
 1926 – Pine Bluff (3)
 1925 – Fort Smith
 1924 – Pine Bluff (2)
 1923 – Pine Bluff 
 1922 – Texarkana (3)
 1921 – Leslie
 1920 – Little Rock (6)
 1919 – Texarkana (2)
 1918 – Little Rock (5)
 1917 – Little Rock (4)
 1916 – Jonesboro
 1915 – Stuttgart (2)
 1914 – Stuttgart
 1913 – Little Rock (3)
 1912 – Little Rock (2)
 1911 – Jonesboro Woodland College 
 1910 – Little Rock
 1909 – Texarkana

Notes: 
 Little Rock HS became Little Rock Central in 1955.
 Fort Smith HS became FS Northside in 1963.
 North Little Rock Ole Main HS and NLR Jones HS merged in 1970.
 North Little Rock has vacated the 2014 title.

Past overall boys basketball champions 
From 1972 to 1992, the Arkansas Activities Association organized an overall state championship tournament of the classification state champions.
 1992 – LR Parkview (2)
 1991 – West Memphis (3)
 1990 – Pine Bluff (2)
 1989 – Blytheville
 1988 – LR Parkview
 1987 – Fayetteville
 1986 – Dermott
 1985 – Magnolia
 1984 – LR Hall (2)
 1983 – LR Hall
 1982 – Gurdon
 1981 – West Memphis (2)
 1980 – West Memphis
 1979 – Parkdale
 1978 – Dumas
 1977 – Pine Bluff
 1976 – Conway
 1975 – LR Central (3)
 1974 – FS Northside
 1973 – LR Central (2)
 1972 – LR Central

Most boys basketball championships 
 19 - Little Rock/LR Central
 16 - Jonesboro
 16 - North Little Rock
 14 - LR Parkview
 13 - Pine Bluff
 10 - Earle
 10 - LR Hall

List of Arkansas state high school girls basketball champions 

2023 - Conway (2), Greenwood (6), Farmington, Salem, Mount Vernon-Enola, Mammoth Spring
2022 - North Little Rock (5), Greenwood (5), Nashville, Bergman, Melbourne (4), Norfork
2021 - FS Northside (8), Jonesboro (3), Harrison (5), Mayflower, Melbourne (3), Rural Special 
 2020 - Bentonville/Fayetteville, Nettleton/Greenwood, Farmington/Star City, Mtn. View/Valley Springs, Melbourne, Kirby
 2019 – FS Northside (6A) (7), LR Christian (5A), Batesville (4A) (6), Mountain View (3A) (2), Melbourne (2A) (2), Wonderview (1A) (3)
 2018 – North Little Rock (7A), Jonesboro (6A) (2), Hot Springs (5A), Central Arkansas Christian (4A), Charleston (3A), Earle (2A), Wonderview (1A) (2)
 2017 – Fayetteville (7A), Marion (6A), Watson Chapel (5A), Pocahontas (4A), Hoxie (3A), Quitman (2A), Bay (1A)
 2016 – North Little Rock (7A), Jonesboro (6A), Watson Chapel (5A), Riverview (4A), Valley Springs (3A), Earle (2A), Nemo Vista (1A)
 2015 – Fayetteville (7A), Greenwood (6A), Hot Springs (5A), Riverview (4A), Greenland (3A), Marmaduke (2A), Nemo Vista (1A)
 2014 – Conway (7A), Greenwood (6A), Paragould (5A), Malvern (4A), eStem (3A), Spring Hill (2A), Nemo Vista (1A)
 2013 – FS Northside (7A), LR Hall (6A), Jacksonville (5A), Malvern (4A), Greenland (3A), Norphlet (2A), Nevada (1A)
 2012 – Cabot, LR Parkview, Greenwood, Star City, Greenland, England, Wonderview
 2011 – Fayetteville, El Dorado, Watson Chapel, Shiloh Christian, Mountain View, England, Calico Rock
 2010 – North Little Rock, Watson Chapel, Greenwood, Prairie Grove, Valley Springs, Conway Christian, Kirby
 2009 – Fayetteville, Lake Hamilton, Vilonia, Shiloh Christian, Charleston, Danville, Scranton
 2008 – Conway, Watson Chapel, Camden Fairview, Huntsville, Marshall, Carlisle, Kingston
 2007 – FS Northside, LR Parkview, Camden Fairview, Central Arkansas Christian, Marshall, Carlisle, Sacred Heart
 2006 – North Little Rock, Morrilton, Central Arkansas Christian, Strong, Sacred Heart 
 2005 – LR Parkview, Alma, Central Arkansas Christian, Strong-Huttig, Guy-Perkins
 2004 – LR Parkview, Harrison, Farmington, Harding Academy, Wickes
 2003 – West Memphis, Morrilton, De Queen, Poyen, Guy-Perkins
 2002 – FS Northside, Harrison, Highland, Greenland, Guy-Perkins
 2001 – FS Northside, Harrison, Ozark, Palestine-Wheatley, Guy-Perkins
 2000 – FS Northside, Harrison, Ozark, Greenland, Bradley
 1999 – FS Northside, Siloam Springs, Dover, Greenland, Mt. Pleasant
 1998 – FS Southside, Hot Springs, Ozark, Tuckerman, St. Joseph
 1997 – LR Hall, Hot Springs, Huntsville, Caddo Hills, Van-Cove
 1996 – FS Southside, Greene County Tech, Pocahontas, County Line, Van-Cove
 1995 – Pine Bluff, Lake Hamilton, Mena, East Poinsett, West Side GF
 1994 – Fayetteville, Ridgecrest, Pocahontas, Valley Springs, Emerson
 1993 – Fayetteville, Greene County Tech, Vilonia, Caddo Hills, Delta
 1992 – West Memphis, Batesville, Dardanelle, Nevada, Alpena
 1991 – Bryant (4), Batesville, Lamar, County Line, Parkdale
 1990 – Hot Springs, Rivercrest, Star City, South Side BB, Kingsland
 1989 – Bryant, Wynne, Gentry, South Side Bee Branch, Parkdale
 1988 – Bryant, Batesville, Lamar, Flippin, Newark
 1987 – FS Southside, Hamburg, Drew Central, Turrell, Huttig
 1986 – FS Southside, Mountain Home, Mansfield, Mount Ida, Union
 1985 – FS Southside, Searcy, Hamburg, Flippin, Newark
 1984 – Blytheville, Wynne, McCrory, Flippin, Guy-Perkins
 1983 – Marianna, Batesville, Clinton, Palestine, McNeil
 1982 – Bryant, Batesville, Eudora, Palestine, McNeil
 1981 – LR McClellan, Wynne, Altheimer, Waldo, Emerson

 1980 – LR McClellan, Rivercrest, Clarksville, Palestine, Parkdale
 1979 – Fayetteville, Alma, Vilonia, Waldo, Parkdale
 1978 – Russellville, Rivercrest, Gurdon, Stephens, Plumerville
 1977 – Lonoke, Stephens, McNeil 
 1976 – Alma, Stephens, Calico Rock 
 1975 – Stephens, Calico Rock
 1974 – Rivercrest, Calico Rock 
 1973 – Highland, Melbourne
 1972 – Stephens, Guy–Perkins 
 1971 – Prescott, Vilonia
 1970 – Ashdown, Plumerville 
 1969 – Ashdown, Bradley 
 1968 – Ashdown, Bradley 
 1967 – Perryville, Bradley 
 1966 – Perryville, Bradley 
 1965 – Perryville, Glenwood 
 1964 – England, Lewisville 
 1963 – Leslie, Shawnee
 1962 – Leslie, Bradley
 1961 – England, Viola
 1960 – Waldo, Greenbrier 
 1959 – England, Viola
 1958 – Manila, Greenbrier 
 1957 – Ashdown, Greenbrier 
 1956 – Emerson, Greenbrier 
 1955 – Van Buren
 1954 – Van Buren 
 1953 – Van Buren 
 1952 – Emerson 
 1951 – Van Buren 
 1950 – Van Buren 
 1949 – Marked Tree 
 1948 – Marked Tree 
 1947 – Marianna 
1946 – Marked Tree

Past overall girls basketball champions 
From 1972 to 1992, the Arkansas Activities Association organized an overall state championship tournament of the classification state champions.

 1992 – Dardanelle
 1991 – Bryant (4)
 1990 – South Side Bee Branch
 1989 – Bryant (3)
 1988 – Bryant (2) 
 1987 – FS Southside (2)
 1986 – FS Southside
 1985 – Hamburg
 1984 – Guy-Perkins
 1983 – Batesville
 1982 – Bryant
 1981 – LR McClellan
 1980 – Clarksville
 1979 – Waldo
 1978 – Stephens (4)
 1977 – Stephens (3) 
 1976 – Calico Rock
 1975 – Stephens (2)
 1974 – Rivercrest
 1973 - Melbourne
 1972 – Stephens

Most girls basketball championships 
 8 - FS Northside
 7 - Fayetteville 
 6 - Batesville, Bradley, Greenland, Guy–Perkins, Greenwood
 5 - England, FS Southside, Harrison, Hot Springs, Stephens, North Little Rock, Van Buren, Watson Chapel
 4 - Bryant

See also 

 Arkansas Activities Association
 List of Arkansas state high school baseball champions
 List of Arkansas state high school football champions
 List of Arkansas state high school swimming champions
 List of Arkansas state high school tennis champions
 List of Arkansas state high school track and field champions

References

External links 
 Arkansas Activities Association: Basketball

Basketball champions, List of Arkansas state
high school champions
Arkansas state high school basketball champions, List of